Dynastes moroni is a large scarab beetle endemic to the Sierra de los Tuxtlas region in Mexico.

Taxonomy
This beetle species was originally described as a subspecies, Dynastes hyllus moroni, but subsequent genetic analyses clearly indicate that it is unrelated to Dynastes hyllus; D. hyllus is sister to Dynastes grantii, while D. moroni is sister to Dynastes maya.

References

Dynastinae
Beetles described in 2005